True Beauty may refer to:

 True Beauty (album), the debut studio album by American Idol contestant Mandisa
 True Beauty (American TV series), a 2009 reality television series which aired on ABC
 True Beauty (webtoon), a South Korean webtoon by Yaongyi
 True Beauty (South Korean TV series), a 2020–21 television series based from the webtoon, starring Moon Ga-young, Cha Eun-woo and Hwang In-yeop